The 1920 Earlham Quakers football team represented Earlham College as an independent during the 1920 college football season. Led by second-year head coach Ray Mowe, the Quakers compiled a record of 3–3.

Schedule

References

Earlham
Earlham Quakers football seasons
Earlham Quakers football